Oliver Petersen (born 26 September 2001) is a Norwegian football goalkeeper who plays for Grorud, on loan from Molde.

Career
Petersen hails from Siggerud. Playing youth and senior football for local umbrella team Follo FK, he was their goalkeeper in the first half of the 2018 3. divisjon before moving on to Molde's junior team. He also became a Norwegian youth international. Petersen got a one-off appearance in the 2019 Norwegian Football Cup, but was first drafted into the senior team in 2021, making his Eliteserien debut in June 2021 against Sandefjord.

Career statistics

Honours
Norwegian Cup: 2021–22

References

2001 births
Living people
People from Ski, Norway
Norwegian footballers
Norway youth international footballers
Follo FK players
Molde FK players
Eliteserien players
Association football goalkeepers
Sportspeople from Viken (county)
21st-century Norwegian people